Micrococcus lylae is a gram positive bacterium. The normal habitat for this Micrococcus species is skin, dust, and water. Its type strain is ATCC 27566. It grows in tetrads, irregular clusters, and cubical packets of eight, and colonies are often brightly pigmented. They are strictly aerobic.

See also
Kocuria kristinae

References

External links
Vumicro entry
PATHOGEN SAFETY DATA SHEET – PHAC
UniProt entry
StrainInfo entry
Type strain of Micrococcus lylae at BacDive -  the Bacterial Diversity Metadatabase

Micrococcaceae
Bacteria described in 1974